Shinzan (シンザン; 2 April 1961 – 13 July 1996) was a thoroughbred racehorse that won the Japanese Triple Crown.

Background
Shinzan was a bay horse bred by Yoshimatsu Matsuhashi. He was sired by  Irish Derby winner Hindostan. His dam, Hayanobori was a great-granddaughter of the Irish mare Beautiful Dreamer who was imported to Japan in the 1930s and became extremely influential: her other descendants included the Japanese classic winners Kazuyoshi, Jitsu Homare, Hakuryo and Meiji Hikari.  Shinzan was foaled on April 2, 1961, in the Hokkaidō Prefecture.

Racing career
Shinzan was generally considered to be the best Japanese racehorse of the post-war era and became the first horse to win all 5 big titles of Japan including the Japanese Triple Crown.

He became the second horse to win the Japanese Triple Crown and was named Japanese Horse of the Year in 1964. Shinzan won the Arima Kinen, Takarazuka Kinen and Tenno Sho (Autumn) as a four-year-old, defending his Horse of the Year title.

Stud record
Shinzan was a successful sire in Japan. His most successful offspring was Miho Shinzan (ミホシンザン) who won the Japanese 2,000 Guineas, Japanese St. Leger, and the Tenno Sho (Spring).

Pensioned form stud duties in 1987, Shinzan spent the rest of life at Tanikawa Stud. He lost the sight in his right eye in his later years and also lost all of his teeth. Eventually, he could not stand by himself at times, and his physical weakening became more prominent after February, 1994. He died of old age at about 2:00 a.m. on July 13, 1996. He was 35 years, three months and 11 days old.

A funeral service was held posthumously. Shinzan's grave is located in the Tanikawa Stud of Urakawacho, Urakawa-gun, Hokkaido, and a bronze statue of Shinzan was built in this stud.

Principal Race Wins
 1964 Fuji TV Sho Spring Stakes, Tokyo Turf 1800m
 1964 Satsuki Sho (Japanese 2,000 Guineas), Tokyo Turf 2000m
 1964 Tokyo Yushun (Japanese Derby), Tokyo Turf 2400m
 1964 Kikuka Sho (Japanese St. Leger), Kyoto Turf 3000m
 1965 Takarazuka Kinen, Hanshin Turf 2000m 
 1965 Meguro Kinen (Autumn), Tokyo Turf 2500m
 1965 Tenno Sho (Autumn), Tokyo Turf 3200m
 1965 Arima Kinen (Grand Prix), Nakayama Turf 2600m

Satsuki Sho, Tokyo Yushun, Kikuka Sho, Tenno Sho (Autumn), Arima Kinen was 5 of the 8 major races in Japan (the other 3 are Oka Sho, Yushun Himba, and Teio Sho (Spring)), before the introduction of Grade in 1984 which categorized all as GI in 1984. Also, before 1981, a horse can only win Tenno Sho once in their career.

Awards
 1964 Horse of the Year and Best Three-year-old Colt (Keishu Award)
 1965 Horse of the Year and Best Older Colt or Horse (Keishu Award)
 1984 JRA Hall of Fame horse
(Keishu Award is current JRA Award.)

See also
 List of historical horses
 St Lite (Japanese first Triple crown in 1941)
 Mr. C.B. (Japanese Triple crown in 1983)
 Symboli Rudolf (Japanese first undefeated Triple crown in 1984)
 Narita Brian (Japanese Triple crown in 1994)
 Deep Impact (Japanese undefeated Triple crown in 2005)
 Orfevre (Japanese Triple crown in 2011)
 Contrail (Japanese undefeated Triple crown in 2020)

Pedigree

References 

Thoroughbred family 12
1961 racehorse births
1996 racehorse deaths
Triple Crown of Thoroughbred Racing winners
Racehorses bred in Japan
Racehorses trained in Japan
Japanese Thoroughbred Horse of the Year